Apateticus is a genus of predatory stink bugs in the family Pentatomidae. There are about seven described species in Apateticus.

Species
These seven species belong to the genus Apateticus:
 Apateticus anatarius Van Duzee, 1935
 Apateticus bracteatus (Fitch, 1856)
 Apateticus crocatus (Uhler, 1897)
 Apateticus cynicus (Say, 1832)
 Apateticus lineolatus (Herrich-Schaeffer, 1840)
 Apateticus ludovicianus Stoner
 Apateticus marginiventris (Stål, 1870)

References

Further reading

 
 

Asopinae
Pentatomidae genera
Articles created by Qbugbot